John Lott (born May 9, 1964 in Denton, Texas) is a former NFL offensive tackle and current American football coach for the Los Angeles Chargers  who became most famous as a strength and conditioning coach for several National Football League teams and for being the coach at the bench reps session at the NFL Scouting Combine. His "soundtrack" is very popular and the NFL Network puts a microphone on him during every workout.

He started as an offensive lineman for the University of North Texas and was named All-Conference twice and All-American his senior year. Lott was a team captain and was even the strongest man in school history. He was a brother of Theta Chi. He played two seasons for the Pittsburgh Steelers and New York Jets before joining his alma mater at North Texas to oversee the eleven Varsity programs. In 1991, he was named strength and conditioning coach for the University of Houston where he stayed until 1996. A year later he was hired by the New York Jets where he was the strength and conditioning coach for eight seasons, from 1997 until 2004. He worked with Ken Whisenhunt on the Jets team in 2000. From 2005–2006 he was the strength and conditioning coach for the Cleveland Browns before being hired by the Cardinals in 2007. He was signed by the Los Angeles Chargers in 2017 as part of new coach Anthony Lynn's rebuilding of the team. Lott reunites with Ken Whisenhunt for the first time since working together with the Cardinals in 2013.

External links
Arizona Cardinals biography
Official Chargers Roster Website

1964 births
Living people
Sportspeople from Denton, Texas
American football offensive tackles
American strength and conditioning coaches
North Texas Mean Green football players
Pittsburgh Steelers players
New York Jets players
North Texas Mean Green football coaches
Houston Cougars football coaches
New York Jets coaches
Cleveland Browns coaches
Arizona Cardinals coaches
Los Angeles Chargers coaches
National Football League replacement players